John Sorenson or John Sörenson may refer to:

 John Sörenson (1889–1976), Swedish  gymnast
 John L. Sorenson (born 1924), American professor of anthropology

See also
Sorenson (disambiguation)